Jaynagarer Moa is a seasonal Bengali sweetmeat delicacy prepared from date palm jaggery and Kanakchur khoi. This variety of Moa originated in Jaynagar of the South 24 Parganas district in the Indian state of West Bengal. It is now a popular sweet, being produced in Kolkata and elsewhere, sometimes with cheaper ingredients and chemical flavours. Jaynagarer Moa was given a Geographical Indication tag in 2015  which will enable the product to be protected from unauthorized uses and piracy.

History

According to researcher, the inventor of Jaynagarer Moa is Jaminiburo, a resident of Bahru village, near Jaynagar town. One day, at an event, he prepared and served Moa made with his own farm-grown Kanakchur Khoi and, Nolen Gur. Gradually the Moa became very popular all around the Jaynagar city. 

In 1920s two friends Purna Chandra Ghosh (aka Purna) and Nityagopal Sarkar (aka Buchki) started selling the Moa in local weekly markets and it came to be known as Buchki's Moa, which later came to be known as Joynagarer Moa. In 1929 Buchki and Nitya set up their own sweet shop named Sri Krishna Mistanna Bhandar in Jaynagar Town, near Jaynagar Majilpur railway station. The shop is still in operation and is managed by the grand daughter of Purna Chandra Ghosh.

Recipe
Jaynagarer Moa is made with Nolen Gur (jaggery made from date palm tree extract with exquisite taste and aroma), Kanakchur khoi (a form of popped rice made from a special variety of aromatic rice), Gawa ghee (a type of clarified butter made from cow's milk),  (cardamom), and posto (poppy seed). Both Nolen Gur and Kanakchur rice are winter products (available around November to January) and hence Jaynagarer Moa is available during this period only. The ordinary or common Moa is a small crispy ball made of puffed rice ("Muri" rather than "Khoi") and jaggery. It is produced in homes all over Bengal and is also generally available in grocery shops in small plastic packets, throughout the year.

There are over 250 sweetmeat shops around Jaynagar, which produce Jaynagarer Moa with the original ingredients.

Challenges
The popularity of the dish has led in recent years to sweetmeat makers all over West Bengal, particularly Kolkata, producing large quantities of Jaynagarer Moa using cheaper ingredients flavoured with chemical aromatics and marketing them as Jaynagarer Moa.

Date palm jaggery is becoming harder to come by due to the decrease in the number of date palms in West Bengal and the shift of members of the Shiuli community, traditional producers of "Nolen Gur" from date palm juice, to other professions. Similarly, Kanakchur rice is a local variant which grows only in winter and through traditional fertiliser-free techniques only.

References

Further reading

Sweets of West Bengal
Bengali cuisine
Indian desserts
South 24 Parganas district
Geographical indications in West Bengal
Geography of Jaynagar Majilpur